is a racing arcade game, which had been released by Namco in 1989 only in Japan; it runs on Namco System 2 hardware, and allows up to four players to play simultaneously, when four cabinets are linked together (much like Namco's own Final Lap, which was released two years earlier) they can allow up to eight players to play simultaneously, when four two-player cabinets are linked together.

Gameplay
Each player must take control of a colour-coded car (red for 1P, green for 2P, blue for 3P and yellow for 4P) which are competing in an off-road race; they are given a preset amount of time in which to complete each of the track's six sections and for each section of the track that is successfully completed, the players' time gets extended. However, if any one of the players do not manage to successfully complete the current section of the track before their time runs out, the game will like in other Namco multiplayer racing titles (such as the aforementioned Final Lap) instantly be over and the race will continue without them - and between four and seven purple CPU-controlled cars will also start the race with the players, but they may catch up with additional ones in preset positions on the track.

Reception 
In Japan, Game Machine listed Dirt Fox on their August 15, 1989 issue as being the twelfth most-successful upright/cockpit arcade game of the month.

References

1989 video games
Arcade video games
Arcade-only video games
Namco arcade games
Japan-exclusive video games
Off-road racing video games
Top-down racing video games
Video games developed in Japan
Video games scored by Shinji Hosoe
Multiplayer and single-player video games